Hi Honey is the third studio album by American rock and roll band Low Cut Connie. It was released on April 21, 2015 on Contender Records. Guests who appear on the album include Merrill Garbus of Tune-Yards, as well as Dean Ween and Greg Cartwright.

Recording
Hi Honey was recorded at a small space owned by Daptone Records and produced by Thomas Brenneck, who is known for his work with Sharon Jones & The Dap-Kings.

Critical reception

Dave Tomar wrote in the Huffington Post that Hi Honey "brims with something more than just the wounded abandon that distinguished previous recordings" and said that it "borrows furiously and confidently from history to deliver an immediate blast of booty-shaking brilliance." Stephen Thomas Erlewine, of AllMusic, awarded the album four out of five stars and said that "the nifty thing about Hi Honey is how it's cleverly produced to replicate the kinetic sensation of hearing a stack of 45s being spun through an old jukebox." Eric Schuman, writing for Magnet, named the album "essential new music" in May 2015 and said that it was "both retro-minded and forward-thinking."

Track listing
Who the Hell is Tina? - 0:59
Shake it Little Tina - 3:22
Diane (Don't Point that Thing at Me) - 2:24
Back in School - 2:06
Me N Annie - 3:24
Taste So Good - 3:25
Dickie's Bringin Me Down - 3:25
Danny's Outta Money - 4:20
Little Queen of New Orleans - 3:56
Dumb Boy - 2:22
The Royal Screw - 2:32
Somewhere Along the Avenue - 2:18
Both My Knees - 4:06

Personnel
Thomas Brenneck-	Engineer, Mixing, Producer
Greg Cartwright- Guest Artist
Alecia Chakour-	Vocals (Background)
Will Donnelly-	Group Member
Sabrina Ellis-	 Vocals (Background)
James Everhart-	Group Member
Dan Finnemore-	Composer, Group Member
Merrill Garbus-	Guest Artist
Dave Guy-	Horn
Roger Holcombe-	 Featured Artist
Wondress Hutchinson-	Vocals (Background)
Phil Knott-	Inside Photo
Huddie Ledbetter-	Composer
Low Cut Connie-	Primary Artist
Kevin Nix-	Mastering
Vinnie Pastore-	Guest Artist
Anders Petersen-	 Cover Photo
Russell Saliba-	Featured Artist
Robert Schuler-	Featured Artist
Neal Sugarman-	Horn
Jared Tankel-	Horn
Aaron Tanner-	Art Direction, Design
Traditional-	Composer
Dean Ween-	Guest Artist
Adam Weiner-	 Composer, Group Member
Saundra Williams-	Vocals (Background)

References

2015 albums
Low Cut Connie albums